Tomasz Łuczak (born 13 March 1963 in Poznań) is a Polish mathematician and professor at Adam Mickiewicz University in Poznań and Emory University. His main field of research is combinatorics, specifically discrete structures, such as random graphs, and their chromatic number.

Under supervision of Michał Karoński, Łuczak earned his doctorate at Adam Mickiewicz University in Poznań in 1987. In 1992, he was awarded the EMS Prize and in 1997 he received the prestigious Prize of the Foundation for Polish Science for his work on the theory of random discrete structures.

References

External links
Website at Emory University 
Website at Adam Mickiewicz University

1963 births
Adam Mickiewicz University in Poznań alumni
Academic staff of Adam Mickiewicz University in Poznań
Combinatorialists
Emory University faculty
Living people
People from Atlanta
Polish mathematicians